The Governor Leslie Jensen House, at 309 S. Fifth St. in Hot Springs, South Dakota, was built in 1899 for Christian Jensen, and it was the longtime home of Christian's son and South Dakota's 15th governor Leslie Jensen (1892–1964).

It is a "simplified vernacular Queen Anne cottage built of brick, with some decorative Stick Style and Eastlake details.  Also known as The Jensen House or the Christian Jensen House, it was listed on the National Register of Historic Places in 1987.  The listing included its carriage house as a contributing building.

See also
Governor William J. Bulow House, Beresford, South Dakota, also NRHP-listed
Governor John L. Pennington House, Yankton, South Dakota, also NRHP-listed

References

South Dakota
Houses on the National Register of Historic Places in South Dakota
Queen Anne architecture in South Dakota
Houses completed in 1899
Houses in Fall River County, South Dakota
National Register of Historic Places in Fall River County, South Dakota